Ty2 may refer to:TY2 aka Lennox Florida based rap artist.
PKP class Ty2, a German-made steam locomotive which was used by Polish State Railways
Ty2 retrotransposon, a Saccharomyces cerevisiae transposon family.
Ty the Tasmanian Tiger 2: Bush Rescue, a video game

See also
Ty21a